Dendrophilia is a genus of moths in the family Gelechiidae.

Distribution
Russia, Korea, Japan, China, Taiwan, India and Indonesia (Java).

Species
Subgenus Dendrophilia
Dendrophilia acris Park, 1995
Dendrophilia albidella (Snellen, 1884)
Dendrophilia caraganella Ponomarenko, 1993
Dendrophilia fujianensis H.H. Li & Z.M. Zheng, 1998
Dendrophilia grandimacularis H.H. Li & Z.M. Zheng, 1998
Dendrophilia henanensis H.H. Li & Z.M. Zheng, 1998
Dendrophilia hetaeropsis (Meyrick, 1935)
Dendrophilia leguminella Ponomarenko, 1993
Dendrophilia mediofasciana (Park, 1991)
Dendrophilia neotaphronoma Ponomarenko, 1993 (=Dendrophilia obscurella Park, 1993)
Dendrophilia saxigera Meyrick, 1931
Dendrophilia solitaria Ponomarenko, 1993
Dendrophilia sophora H.H. Li & Z.M. Zheng, 1998
Dendrophilia stictocosma (Meyrick, 1920)
Dendrophilia taphronoma (Meyrick, 1932)
Dendrophilia tetragama (Meyrick, 1935)
Dendrophilia unicolorella Ponomarenko, 1993
Dendrophilia yifengensis H.H. Li & Z.M. Zheng, 1998
Dendrophilia yuanjiangensis H.H. Li & Z.M. Zheng, 1998
Dendrophilia yuexiensis H.H. Li & Z.M. Zheng, 1998
Dendrophilia yushanica H.H. Li & Z.M. Zheng, 1998
Subgenus Microdendrophilia Ponomarenko, 1993
Dendrophilia petrinopsis (Meyrick, 1935)

References

Li, H.H. & Zheng, Z.M. (1998). "A systematic study on the genus Dendrophilia Ponomarenko, 1993 from China (Lepidoptera: Gelechiidae)". Shilap Revista de Lepidopterologia. 26 (102): 101–111.

 
Chelariini